Meeco is an internationally acclaimed music producer and composer who has worked and recorded with a great range of well-known artist from various genres, including jazz, hip-hop, soul, pop and latin. He is known for moving effortlessly between different styles of music, blending jazz improvisations with hip-hop and soul.

The below cites some of the artists Meeco has recorded with:

Jazz: Gregory Porter, Benny Golson, Ron Carter, Hubert Laws, Kenny Barron, Buster Williams, Freddy Cole, James Moody, Bennie Maupin, Eddie Henderson, David “Fathead” Newman, Lionel Loueke, Vincent Herring, Victor Lewis, Cedar Walton, Charlie Mariano, Stefon Harris, David Friedman.

Hip-Hop:Talib Kweli, Havoc, Inspectah Deck, Smif-N-Wessun, Fredro Starr, Elzhi, Ras Kass, Masta Ace, Lil Fame, Fashawn, Termanology, Grafh, JD Era, Rasco, Big Shug, Sadat X, El Da Sensei, amongst many others.

Soul: Yahzarah, Jean Baylor (Zhané), Casey Benjamin, Aaron Marcellus.

Pop: Jane Birkin

Latin: Jaques Morelenbaum, Romero Lubambo, Olvido Ruiz

Meeco has released four albums, the fifth to be released in 2020. In the year 2015 he released "Souvenirs of love" on the established Jazz label "Double Moon Records". Critics consider this album to be his best work so far. Amargo Mel (2009)  and Perfume e Caricias (2010)  came out on German label Connector and on US label Spectra Jazz. His third album Beauty of the Night (released in April 2012) features performances by Brazilian singer Eloisia (Nouvelle Vague), Freddy Cole, Joe Bataan, Gregory Porter, Lionel Loueke and Jane Birkin. In 2002, Meeco wrote a song for the major German motion picture Soloalbum directed by Gregor Schnitzler.

In 2020, Meeco is going to release his fifth album WE OUT HERE which will feature boom bap sound.

Biography 
As a young child, Meeco was heavily influenced by his father who played classical piano, making it natural to follow in his progenitor’s footsteps. Meeco began lessons at six years old, and after several years of studying classical music, he sought other musical outlets. After a friend introduced vintage Ella Fitzgerald, Horace Silver and McCoy Tyner recordings,  Meeco became enamored with jazz music.

Highly inspired and motivated, he attempted to imitate the sounds he heard on the records, but found he needed more experience with jazz music. He sought piano and theoretical study with the first of his mentors, pianist and producer Marco Meister (producer of German electro group Terranova (band)).  With Meister, Meeco gained musical skills and invaluable studio experience in producing his own music.

Meeco met his second mentor, New York pianist/singer Bob Lenox quite by accident. Lenox, who at the time was working in Berlin, Germany as a staff writer for Warner Bros. Records and performing with artists such as Esther Phillips, Pee Wee Ellis, Garland Jefferies and others, became a teacher and close friend.  It was through Bob Lenox that Meeco came to the conclusion that the only important thing in music, whether composition or pianistic skill, was creating the right “feeling”.

It was with the knowledge gained by these two mentors, that Meeco quickly gained a reputation as producer for some of Berlin’s finest working musicians.

Meeco's music has been described as "impressionistic", "romantic" as well as "fragile and introspective".

Discography 
 Amargo Mel (2009) with Eva Ventura, Eloisia, Olvido Ruiz Castellanos, Rolando Faria, Reggie Moore, Guilherme Castro, Rolo Rodriguez and featuring Ron Carter, Hubert Laws, Eddie Henderson (musician), David “Fathead” Newman, Charlie Mariano, David Friedman (percussionist), Bob Lenox, Mario "El Indio" Morejon
 Perfume e Caricias (2010) featuring Eloisia, Eddie Henderson (musician), Kenny Barron, Buster Williams, James Moody (saxophonist), Vincent Herring
 Beauty of the Night (2012) featuring Eloisia, Freddy Cole, Gregory Porter, Joe Bataan, Zé Manoel, Jane Birkin, Hubert Laws, Eddie Henderson (musician), Benny Golson, Bennie Maupin, Kenny Barron, Lionel Loueke, Romero Lubambo, Stefon Harris, Jaques Morelenbaum, Buster Williams, Victor Lewis
 Souvenirs of love (2015)

References

Reviews in Germany

See also

1976 births
Living people
Musicians from Berlin
German emigrants to France
Musicians from Paris